Alexander Vladimirovich Politkovsky  (born 15 September 1953) is a Russian journalist, political commentator, and a professor at the Moscow Institute of Television and Radio Broadcasting.

From 1987 to 1991 he was a special correspondent and presenter of an infotainment program Vzglyad. Politkovsky was one of the founders of the TV company VID. He was elected as a Deputy of the Russian Federation for the period of 1990 to 1993.

His former spouse Anna Politkovskaya was murdered on 7 October 2006.

References

External links
 Александр Политковский: «Нынешнее телевидение — это гадюшник» Почему он не хочет возвращаться на ТВ

1953 births
Living people
Soviet journalists
Russian male journalists
Russian reporters and correspondents
Moscow State University alumni
Soviet film directors
Russian film directors
Mass media people from Moscow
20th-century Russian journalists
21st-century Russian journalists